Brian Hanrahan (22 March 1949 – 20 December 2010) was a British television journalist, who was the Diplomatic News Editor for the British Broadcasting Corporation (BBC).

Early life, education and early career
Hanrahan was born in the county of Middlesex, England, on 22 March 1949, the son of a construction worker. He was educated at St Ignatius' College, Stamford Hill, in Tottenham, and subsequently studied Politics at the University of Essex, where he was a member of an amateur dramatic society.

In 1970, Hanrahan joined the BBC as a photographic stills clerk. He was one of the six news trainees appointed by the BBC in 1971, and went on to become a news scriptwriter with the organisation, and then a Duty Editor in the BBC Television Newsroom. He worked for a spell as the BBC's Northern Ireland correspondent, during which time he reported on The Troubles.

Falklands War
As a BBC war correspondent Hanrahan joined the press corps attached to the Task Force dispatched by the Government of the United Kingdom to counter the Argentine invasion of the Falkland Islands in 1982.
One report filed by Hanrahan whilst travelling with the Task Force southwards through the Atlantic Ocean aboard the Royal Navy aircraft carrier  was particularly notable. He was reporting on an early air strike by Harrier jump jets operating from Hermes, when, to work a way around reporting restrictions regarding disclosure of classified military information, he stated "I'm not allowed to say how many planes joined the raid, but I counted them all out, and I counted them all back." The phrase later inspired the title of a book about conflict that he co-authored.

Hanrahan later went ashore on East Falkland during the land campaign, and reported from amidst British Armed Forces units in the frontline whilst under fire, and was present at the liberation of Port Stanley by them on 14 June 1982, which ended the war.

Later career
During the mid-1980s he was a BBC correspondent in Hong Kong reporting on the negotiation by the British Government for transferring the governance of the territory to China. He later visited Moscow, reporting on the end of the Soviet Union in 1989.

Death

Hanrahan died of bowel cancer on 20 December 2010, aged 61.

Martin Bell wrote of him in an obituary published in The Guardian: "In the world of television news, where inflated egos are not unknown, Brian Hanrahan stood out for his modesty as well as his way with words."

Personal life
Hanrahan married radio producer Honor Wilson in 1986. They had a daughter, Catherine and son Luke.

Publications

References

External links
 BBC Profile of Brian Hanrahan
 Obituary of Brian Hanrahan, The Daily Telegraph, 20 December 2010
 Obituary of Brian Hanrahan, The Guardian, 20 December 2010
 Obituary of Brian Hanrahan, The Independent, 21 December 2010
 Obituary of Brian Hanrahan, The New York Times, 23 December 2010

Audio clips
 Counting returning Harriers
 Bombing in Bluff Cove
 Argentinian surrender

Video clips
 Chernobyl
 As the BBC's Diplomatic Editor

1949 births
2010 deaths
Alumni of the University of Essex
British people of the Falklands War
British reporters and correspondents
British Roman Catholics
British war correspondents
BBC newsreaders and journalists
Deaths from cancer in the United Kingdom
People educated at St Ignatius' College, Enfield
Television personalities from London
Place of death missing